This list of U.S. cities by Black population covers all incorporated cities and Census-designated places with a population over 100,000 and a proportion of Black residents over 30% in the 50 U.S. states, the District of Columbia, and the territory of Puerto Rico and the population in each city that is Black or African American.

The data source for the list is the 2020 United States Census.

At the time of the 2020 Census, there were 47.5 million Americans who were Black (either alone or in combination), making up 14.2% of the U.S. population. State by state, the highest number of Black Americans could be found in Texas (3.96 million), Florida (3.70 million), Georgia (3.54 million), New York (3.53 million), and California (2.83 million). Meanwhile, the highest proportions of African Americans were in the District of Columbia (44.17%), Mississippi (37.94%), Louisiana (33.13%), Georgia (33.03%), and Maryland (32.01%).

Throughout the country, there are 342 cities with a population over 100,000. 19 of them had Black (alone or in combination) majorities, and in 46 more cities, between 30% and 50% of the population identified as Black. Out of the 19 majority-Black cities, four were in Georgia and Louisiana and Alabama had three each. Meanwhile, the states of Florida, Ohio, Michigan, New Jersey, Virginia, Tennessee, Massachusetts, Maryland, and Mississippi each had one majority-Black city.

In 2020, the largest cities which had a Black majority were Detroit, Michigan (population 639K), Memphis, Tennessee (population 633K), Baltimore, Maryland (population 586K), New Orleans, Louisiana (population 384K), and Cleveland, Ohio (population 373K).

List

The list below displays each city (or city-equivalent) in the fifty states, the District of Columbia, and Puerto Rico with a population over 100,000 and a Black proportion over 30% as of the 2020 Census. It includes the city's total population, the number of Black people in the city, and the percentage of people in the city who are Black as of the 2020 Census. The table is initially sorted by the Black proportion of each city but is sortable by any of its columns, as can be found by clicking the table headers.

Cities where people who are Black alone are not at least 30% of the population, while people who are either Black alone, or, in combination with another race, do form at least 30% of the population, are italicized.

See also

African Americans
List of U.S. states by African-American population
List of U.S. counties with African-American majority populations
List of U.S. metropolitan areas with large African-American populations
List of U.S. communities with African American majority populations
List of African American neighborhoods
African Americans in Atlanta
African Americans in New York City
History of African Americans
History of African Americans in Baltimore 
History of African Americans in Boston
History of African Americans in Chicago
History of African Americans in Dallas-Ft. Worth
History of African Americans in Detroit
History of African Americans in Houston
History of African Americans in Jacksonville
History of African Americans in Philadelphia
History of African Americans in San Antonio
History of African Americans in Austin
List of U.S. cities with large Hispanic populations
List of United States cities by percentage of white population
Demographics of the United States
Lists of U.S. cities with large ethnic population

References

 	

African-American demographics
African American-related lists
African American